The 1948 Australian Championships was a tennis tournament that took place on outdoor Grass courts at the Kooyong Stadium in Melbourne, Australia from 16 January to 26 January. It was the 36th edition of the Australian Championships (now known as the Australian Open), the 10th held in Melbourne, and the first Grand Slam tournament of the year. Australians Adrian Quist and Nancye Wynne Bolton won the singles titles.

Finals

Men's singles

 Adrian Quist defeated  John Bromwich 6–4, 3–6, 6–3, 2–6, 6–3

Women's singles

 Nancye Wynne Bolton defeated  Marie Toomey  6–3, 6–1

Men's doubles
 John Bromwich /  Adrian Quist defeated  Colin Long /  Frank Sedgman 1–6, 3–6, 8–6, 6–3, 8–6

Women's doubles
 Thelma Coyne Long /  Nancye Wynne Bolton defeated  Mary Bevis /  Pat Jones 6–3, 6–3

Mixed doubles
 Nancye Wynne Bolton /  Colin Long defeated  Thelma Coyne Long /  Bill Sidwell 7–5, 4–6, 8–6

References

External links
 Australian Open official website

1948
1948 in Australian tennis
January 1948 sports events in Australia